Nikola Radmanović (1 March 1969
– 21 July 2022) was a Serbian professional footballer who played as a defensive midfielder.

Career
Born in Velika Gata, a village near Bihać, Radmanović spent two seasons with Vrbas from 1988 to 1990. He later played for Bečej in the 1991–92 Yugoslav Second League, winning the competition and promotion to the top flight.

In the summer of 1992, Radmanović was transferred to Red Star Belgrade. He spent the next four seasons with the club and won four major trophies. In the summer of 1996, Radmanović moved abroad to Spanish club Mérida and was in the team that finished in first place in the 1996–97 Segunda División.

After hanging up his boots, Radmanović served as an assistant to Vladimir Petrović at Red Star Belgrade between 2009 and 2010.

Honours
Bečej
 Yugoslav Second League: 1991–92

Red Star Belgrade
 First League of FR Yugoslavia: 1994–95
 FR Yugoslavia Cup: 1992–93, 1994–95, 1995–96

Mérida
 Segunda División: 1996–97

References

External links
 
 

1969 births
2022 deaths
People from Bihać
Yugoslav footballers
Serbia and Montenegro footballers
Serbian footballers
Association football midfielders
First League of Serbia and Montenegro players
FK Vrbas players
OFK Bečej 1918 players
Red Star Belgrade footballers
CP Mérida footballers
Red Star Belgrade non-playing staff
Segunda División players
Serbs of Bosnia and Herzegovina
Expatriate footballers in Spain
Serbia and Montenegro expatriate sportspeople in Spain
Serbia and Montenegro expatriate footballers